Insect Armageddon may mean

 Decline in insect populations, a widespread loss of insect numbers and species
 Earth Defense Force: Insect Armageddon, a computer game